The Indian cricket team toured Zimbabwe from 28 May until 13 June 2010. The tour consisted of the Micromax Cup followed by two T20Is.


Squads

ODI Series

1st match

2nd match

4th match

5th match

T20I Series

1st T20I

2nd T20I

References

External links

2009–10 Zimbabwean cricket season
2010 in Indian cricket
2010